"Release the Pressure" is the third single by the English electronic duo Leftfield and the first to involve Paul Daley with writing duties after he joined the group. The song was released exclusively on 12" in 1992. Unlike previous releases that had been released on the Outer Rhythm record label, Leftfield had now officially split from Outer Rhythm. Major labels had offered them deals but neither member wanted to give up creative control to any major company. They formed the Hard Hands record label with "Release the Pressure" being the label's first official release. The song featured reggae singer Earl Sixteen on vocals, with a lyric taken from his 1981 single "Trial and Crosses". "Release the Pressure" made the top 20 in the UK charts and featured at number one in the Melody Maker "Stone Free Chart of the Year". It was used in Telefónica O2 and O2 (UK) commercials during its first year.

Critical reception 
In 1992, Melody Maker named the song "Single of the Week", writing that Earl Sixteen's "laid-back drawl weaves in and out of the slow, seductive groove and alternates with a beautiful Arabian keyboard melody. It works a perfect charm. The trance dance FX will have you levitating and, in such a vulnerable physical and mental state, the Andy Weatherall-esque drum rolls will catch you unawares every time."

A reviewer from Music Week gave the 1996 version three out of five, describing it as a "very commercial dub techno tune." Brad Beatnik from the RM Dance Update, rated it five out of five and named it Tune of the Week, declaring it as a "cool, soulful ragga-fuelled track". He concluded with that "once again, the production quality is superb and Leftfield provide plenty for the feet and the mind."

Track listing
 12"
 "Release the Pressure" (The Vocal Mix) 8:08
 "Release the Pressure" (The Rough Dub) 8:40
 "Release the Pressure" (The Desert Edit) 5:02

1996 version
In 1996, an updated version of "Release the Pressure" was released as the eighth single under the Leftfield name.  It was released on 12", CD and Cassette on 8 January 1996. It featured Earl Sixteen and Cheshire Cat on vocals with ad libs by Papa Dee.  The song reached #13 in the UK charts. There were also four different remixes of the song with different ones as B-sides to the different format releases.

Track listing
 12"
 "Release the Pressure" - 3:57
 "Release the Pressure" (Release One) - 7:23
 "Release the Pressure" (Release Two) - 7:19
 "Release the Pressure" (Release Four) - 5:03

 CD
 "Release the Pressure" - 3:57
 "Release the Pressure" (Release One) - 7:23
 "Release the Pressure" (Release Two) - 7:19
 "Release the Pressure" (Release Three) - 6:02
 "Release the Pressure" (Release Four) - 5:03

 Cassette
 "Release the Pressure" - 3:57
 "Release the Pressure" (Release One) - 7:23
 "Release the Pressure" (Release Two) - 7:19

Charts

References

 Release The Pressure, Leftfield Online, Retrieved on 5 November 2006

1992 singles
1996 singles
Leftfield songs
1992 songs
Chrysalis Records singles
Reggae fusion songs
Dub songs